Taleggio may refer to:

Taleggio, Lombardy, a comune in the Province of Bergamo
Val Taleggio, a valley mainly in the Province of Bergamo
Taleggio cheese, a cheese native to Val Taleggio